Parkes Way is a major road in Canberra, Australia, which runs east-west between Kings Avenue and the Glenloch Interchange. At Glenloch Interchange it intersects with William Hovell Drive, Tuggeranong Parkway, and Caswell Drive (Gungahlin Drive Extension). The road is freeway standard from the Commonwealth Avenue overpass to Glenloch Interchange. Parkes Way is named for prominent Australian federalist, Sir Henry Parkes.

It passes by the edge of Black Mountain and part of the Australian National University via the Acton Tunnel. It also passes just south of the City and north of Commonwealth Park and Kings Park on the shore of Lake Burley Griffin.

Parkes Way was created with an 80 km/h speed limit that remained in place until 2008 when it was changed to 90 km/h.

Future
Draft plans of the "City to Lake" Plan by the ACT government would see Parkes Way be split into 2 levels from the Edinburgh Avenue exit to the Anzac Parade exit. The top level would be a boulevard with street level access to new buildings in the area and intersections to other roads. The bottom level would be a freeway standard tunnel.

Interchanges and intersections

See also

References

Streets in Canberra